Haiti competed at the 1984 Summer Olympics in Los Angeles, United States.  The nation returned to the Olympic Games after participating in the American-led boycott of the 1980 Summer Olympics. Haiti's delegation consisted of two officials and four competitors (one track and field athlete, two fencers, and one tennis player).

Athletics

Men's Marathon
 Dieudonné LaMothe — 2:52:18 (→ 78th place, last finisher)

Fencing

Women's foil

 Gina Faustin
 Round 1 — Won 2 out of 6 matches (→ did not advance)
 Sheila Viard
 Round 1 — Won 0 out of 6 matches (→ did not advance)

Tennis

Men's singles
 Ronald Agénor
 Round 1 — Lost to Stefan Edberg of Sweden (→ did not advance) Note: Edberg went on to take 1st place

References

External links
Official Olympic Reports

Nations at the 1984 Summer Olympics
1984
Summer Olympics